Elliott Jack Hewitt (born 30 May 1994) is a Welsh professional footballer who plays for League Two club Mansfield Town. He can play in a variety of different positions, including right-back, centre-back, winger or central midfield. He is known for his versatility and pace.

He began his career at Macclesfield Town, where he graduated from the club's youth system. He joined Ipswich Town in 2012. He spent three years at Ipswich, spending time on loan at Gillingham and Colchester United before joining Notts County in 2015. He made over one hundred appearances in four seasons for Notts County. He signed for Grimsby Town in 2019 and played 66 games in a two-year spell with the club before joining Mansfield in 2021.

Club career

Macclesfield Town
Born in Rhyl, Denbighshire, Wales, Hewitt progressed through the Macclesfield Town youth ranks and signed his first professional contract in 2010. He made his professional debut in the last game of the 2010–11 season on 7 May 2011, in the EFL League Two 1–1 draw with Hereford United at Moss Rose. He started the 2011–12 season as first choice right back at the club.

Ipswich Town
Hewitt signed a three-year contract with Ipswich Town on 30 May 2012. He travelled with the first team squad on their pre-season tour of the Netherlands, despite continuing his rehabilitation following a hip impingement injury.

Gillingham (loan)
On 13 November 2013, Hewitt signed a 28-day loan with League One side Gillingham. His loan was apparently cut short due to an injury in early December, but on 31 December, Hewitt again signed on loan with Gillingham.

Colchester United (loan)
Hewitt joined Colchester United on a month's loan in October 2014 to provide additional options at the back. He was recalled by Town at the end of his first month, but returned soon afterwards for a second stint. Having been used briefly as a winger during his time at Ipswich, U's boss Tony Humes began to use him in this position over the course of the season, exploiting his attacking nature and pace. He scored his first senior goal against Peterborough United on 10 January 2015, a solo run from his own half to finish from 20 yards.

He was released by Notts County at the end of the 2018–19 season.

International career
Hewitt started his international career earning Wales schoolboy honours. He was first called up to the Wales U17 squad for the Four Nations Tournament in July 2011 in Falkenberg, Sweden. He started in all three matches against Iceland U17, Norway U17 and Sweden U17. His form in this tournament led Brian Flynn to call him up on standby for the Wales U21 squad for the game against Hungary U21 on 10 August 2011. Hewitt did feature in the game, coming on as a half time substitute for David Stephens, in the 2–1 defeat. In January 2013 he was selected in the Wales under 21 squad for the friendly match against Iceland on 6 February 2013

Career statistics

Honours
Individual
Mansfield Town Player of the Year: 2022

References

External links
Ipswich Town profile

1994 births
Living people
Sportspeople from Rhyl
Welsh footballers
Wales youth international footballers
Wales under-21 international footballers
Association football defenders
Macclesfield Town F.C. players
Ipswich Town F.C. players
Gillingham F.C. players
Colchester United F.C. players
Notts County F.C. players
Grimsby Town F.C. players
Mansfield Town F.C. players
English Football League players